Dream House, Dreamhouse or similar may refer to:

Film and television
 Dream House (2011 film), an American psychological thriller film
 Dream House, 1981 American CBS Romance Comedy TV movie, starring Marilu Henner
 Dream House (1931 film), a short film starring Bing Crosby
 Dream House (game show), an American television show whose grand prize was a new house
 Dream House (HGTV), a show on HGTV which follows a family or individual's quest for a dream home

Music
 An alternate term for dream trance, an early genre of trance music that also influenced house music
 The Dreamhouse, a concert venue and home for the Faroese punk rock band The Dreams
 Dreamhouse (band), a British dance/pop group
 Dreamhouse, a 2010 album by Tides of Man
 Dreamhouse, a 2010 album by Steve Poltz
 "Dreamhouse", a 1989 song by Xmal Deutschland from the album Devils
 "The Dreamhouse (Mental Version)", a 1995 song by Suicide Commando from the album Critical Stage
 "The Dreamhouse", a 1995 song by The Young Gods from the album Only Heaven
 "Dream House", a 2013 song by Deafheaven from the album Sunbather
 Dream House 78' 17", a 1974 album by La Monte Young, Marian Zazeela, and the Theatre of Eternal Music

Other
 Dream House (installation), a sound and light installation by La Monte Young and Marian Zazeela
Anne's Dream House
 Dream House (video game), a 1984 video game for the Commodore 64
 The Dreamhouse, a poetry collection by Tom Sleigh
Dream House, a novel by ex-YouTuber Marzia Bisognin

See also
 Dream Home (disambiguation)